Zimbabwe competed at the 1996 Summer Olympics in Atlanta, United States.

Athletics

Men—Track and road events

Men—Field events

Boxing

Cycling

Road

Diving

Men

Swimming

Women

Tennis

References
Official Olympic Reports
sports-reference

Nations at the 1996 Summer Olympics
1996
1996 in Zimbabwean sport